Tiruchirappalli has a well-developed transport infrastructure. Being located almost at the geographic centre of the state Tamil Nadu India, Tiruchirappalli is well connected by Road, Rail and Air with most cities.

Roads 

Tiruchirappalli City has 1294.27 km of Roads as of 2017 in which 268.41 km is of unsurfaced and rest all are surfaced in some form. Bharathidhasan Road has been designed as a Model road of the city. Other Arterial roads include Bharathiyar Road, Collector Office Road, Thennur High Road, Salai Road, Sastri Road, Madurai Road, Thillainagar Main Road, College Road, and Gandhi Road. Various Initiatives has been taken up by the city corporation during 2018 and 2019 with private partnerships, Smart city and various funds to install facilities like Open-Air Gym on roadsides, Fountains with the beatification of roundabouts, One Smart road has also been created.

National highways
Tiruchirappalli being in the central point of the state has major National Highways radiating out as follows

NH 38 (Old NH 45) towards Villupuram, Vellore leading to Chennai
NH 81 (Old NH 227) towards Jayamkondam, Chidambaram
NH 83 (Old NH 67) towards Thanjavur, Nagapattinam
NH 336 (Old NH 210) towards Pudukottai leading to Rameshwaram
NH 38 (Old NH 45B) towards Madurai, Tuticorin
NH 83 (Old NH 45) towards Dindigul, Palani, Coimbatore
NH 81 (Old NH 67) towards Karur, Coimbatore

Major Tamil Nadu State Highways leading out of the city are
SH 22 towards Kumbakonam, Mayiladuthurai, Poompuhar
SH 25 towards Musiri, Namakkal, Salem leading to Bangalore
SH 62 towards Thurayur

Bypass and Ring Road
Tiruchirappalli City has two bypasses built till now. Chennai Bypass was built to shift old NH-45 out of the city starting from No.1 Tollgate to Mannarpuram which extended later to Edamalaipatti Pudhur during the conversion of the highways to four-lane highways. Karur Byepass road was built as an alternate alignment to reach NH 67 from the city near Salai Road without touching Chatiram Bus Station.

A Semi-Ring Road was proposed in 2007 along with a four-lane widening of Old NH 67 and Old NH 45. The semi-ring starts from Jeeyapuram in NH 81 and ends at Thuvakkudi in NH 83 connection NH 83 at Cholan Nagar, NH 38 at Panjappur, NH 336 at Mathur. The project is split into two stages Jeeyapuram to Panchapur and Panchapur to Thuvakudi. The work came to a halt in 2009 due to court case to modify the alignment of stage 1 which was crossing over Lakes. The new alignment was created by NHAI in 2011. And the work has resumed recently in 2019.

Public Transport
An easy way to move across the city is Buses operated by both state-run TNSTC and many private modes of transport. More than 350 buses are running in the city. In addition to this, there are Auto Rickshwas and various Taxi services to avail including Mobile application-based operators to move around the city and its suburbs.

Important Bus Terminals in the City are
 Chatram Bus Stand
 Central Bus Station
 Sri Rangam, new bus stand proposed
 K.K. Nagar
 Thuvakkudi

Tiruchirappalli is a Division under TNSTC, Kumbakonam. There are regular buses to Vellore, Karaikudi, Karur, Thanjavur, Kanniyakumari, Chennai, Madurai, Salem, Palani, Puducherry, Coimbatore, Kodaikanal and Tirupathi. Buses are also available to destinations in Karnataka and Kerala. The Karnataka State Road Transport Corporation (KSRTC) operates bus services between Bengaluru, Mysore and Tiruchirapalli on daily basis.

Rail 

Tiruchirappalli Railway Division is one of the divisions in Southern Railway. Tiruchirappalli Railway Junction has five branches which connects to Kaniyakumari, Erode, Rameshwaram, Karaikal and Chennai. Tiruchirappalli Junction is one of the busiest railway junctions in Tamil Nadu. Tiruchirappalli is an important railway junction in central Tamil Nadu and constitutes a separate division of the Southern Railway. There are frequent trains to Chennai, Coimbatore, Thanjavur, Karur Junction, Karaikudi Kumbakonam, Mayiladuthurai, Karaikal, Chidambaram, Madurai, Vellore Cantonment, Katpadi Junction, Tirupathi, Tuticorin, Tenkasi, Kollam, Rameswaram, Bengaluru, Mysuru, Kochi, Kanyakumari, Mangaluru, Kolkata. About nine express trains operate daily on the Chord line, important among are Pallavan Express and the Rockfort Express. The Mysuru Express plies between Tiruchirappalli and Mysuru on a daily basis, stopping at Salem and Bengaluru on the way. Tiruchirappalli has rail connectivity with most important cities and towns in India.

Air 

Tiruchirapalli International Airport  is a major airport mostly serving Tiruchirapalli and adjacent districts in the state of Tamil Nadu, India.

The Tiruchirapalli International Airport is the second biggest airport in Tamil Nadu after Chennai International Airport. It was first used to handle air traffic in 1938 when Tata Airlines' commercial flights stopped at Tiruchirappalli on the Karachi-Colombo route. In 1948, Air Ceylon commenced daily passenger flights between Tiruchirappalli and Colombo via Jaffna. There are regular flights to Chennai, Sri Lanka, and Dubai. Air India Express has an engineering stores complex at Tiruchirapalli International Airport for repairing aircraft.

The airport is scheduled for expansion soon as the local government has acquired the land in and around the existing airport. This expansion is expected to accommodate larger flights and also expand International operations to more countries given Tiruchirappalli is an integrated industrial hub in Tamil Nadu. Tiruchirappalli International Airport caters for the need of 12 districts in Tamil Nadu like Tiruchirappalli, Thanjavur, Ariyalur, Perambalur, Dindigul, Karur, Karaikal(UT), Nagapattinam, Thiruvarur, Namakkal, Pudukottai and Sivaganga. In November 2011, The airport commenced international cargo operations, for which, the cargo terminal was built at the cost of Rs. 1 crore.

See also

 Transport in Tamil Nadu
 Tiruchirappalli
 Tiruchirappalli Monorail

References

External links